Eugene Urban Stechschulte (born August 12, 1973) is a former Major League Baseball player who pitched for the St. Louis Cardinals from 2000-2002. Stechschulte began his professional baseball career in the Cardinals' minor league system in 1996 as an undrafted free agent.  In 1998, he led the league with 33 saves and 51 games finished in Peoria.  In 1999, he led the Arkansas Travelers with 19 saves.  In 2000, he was second in the Pacific Coast League with 26 saves.

On April 17, 2001, Stechschulte became one of few major leaguers to have homered on the first pitch ever thrown to him and the only pitcher to accomplish the feat as a pinch-hitter. On June 1, 2011, Stechschulte was named the Ohio Northern University baseball coach.

See also
List of Major League Baseball players with a home run in their first major league at bat

References

External links

1973 births
Living people
Ashland Eagles baseball players
Major League Baseball pitchers
Baseball players from Ohio
St. Louis Cardinals players
Somerset Patriots players
Sportspeople from Lima, Ohio
Arkansas Travelers players
Memphis Redbirds players
Peoria Chiefs players
New Jersey Cardinals players

 Gene Stechschulte at SABR (Baseball BioProject)